Karen Campbell (born 1967, Paisley, Scotland) is a Scottish writer of contemporary fiction.  Her first four novels are police procedurals, set in Glasgow, featuring Sgt. Anna Cameron and Cath and Jamie Worth. Her fifth novel, published in 2013, breaks away from the crime series. It tells the story of Abdi, a Somali asylum-seeker newly arrived in Glasgow with his young daughter, and of recently widowed Deborah, who has been assigned as mentor to help them settle in. The novel was selected as the BBC Radio Four Book at Bedtime in April 2013.

Background

Karen Campbell was born in Paisley and brought up in Glasgow.  Both her mother and father worked in Strathclyde Police, and following a degree at Glasgow University, she also joined the police, where she met her husband.

Karen studied for the Creative Writing master's degree at Glasgow University.  She is a vegetarian and lives in Galloway with her husband and two daughters.

Bibliography

 The Twilight Time (2008)
 After The Fire (2009)
 Shadowplay (2010)
 Proof of Life (2011)
 This is Where I Am (2013)
 Rise (2015)
 The Sound of the Hours (2019)
 Paper Cup (2022)

External links
 Karen Campbell's homepage
 Reviews at Euro Crime
 Radio interview, 2009
 The Creative Writing programme at the University of Glasgow
 Sunday Mail article about Karen's time in the police
 Review of Proof of Life

References

1967 births
Living people
Alumni of the University of Glasgow
Scottish crime fiction writers
Writers from Glasgow
Scottish women novelists
21st-century Scottish women writers
Women mystery writers